Lecithocera choleroleuca is a moth in the family Lecithoceridae. It was described by Edward Meyrick in 1931. It is found in Mumbai, India.

The wingspan is about 13 mm. The forewings are ochreous white. The second discal stigma is minute, hardly perceptible and pale greyish ochreous. The hindwings are whitish.

References

Moths described in 1931
Taxa named by Edward Meyrick
choleroleuca